Frico Kafenda (October 2, 1883 – September 3, 1963) was a Slovak composer, and a musical pedagogue. His piano students included a famous composer Eugen Suchoň.

Kafenda was born in Mosóc (present-day Mošovce). Following his studies he worked in Germany as a conductor, but returned to Slovakia after World War I. He attempted to compose Slovak national opera, but due to the advent of World War II his work remained unfinished. He died in Bratislava.

Gallery

External links
Some biographical information

1883 births
1963 deaths
Slovak composers
Male composers
Mošovce
People from Turčianske Teplice District
Slovak male musicians